Bow Brickhill is a village and civil parish in the unitary authority area of the City of Milton Keynes, Buckinghamshire, England.

The village name is a combination of Brythonic and Old English words for 'hill' (Brythonic: breg, Anglo Saxon hyll).  The prefix 'Bow' comes from an Anglo Saxon personal name, Bolla.  The various names of the village given in historic records were Brichelle (11th century); Brichull (12th century); Bolle Brichulle, Bellebrikhulle (13th century), and Bolbryghyll (15th century, 1418).

Church
The Church of England parish church of All Saints stands apart from the rest of the village, on the side of a steep hill. The church probably dates from the 12th century but heavy remodelling in the 15th century obliterated most of the earlier details. The church was extensively restored by Browne Willis in 1757.

The hymn tune Bow Brickhill by Sydney Nicholson was composed in honour of All Saints' parish church, after Nicholson and his choristers from Westminster Abbey performed there in 1923.

Transport

Listed buildings and structures
The parish church is listed as Grade II*. There are a further four buildings or structures listed as Grade II.

See also
 Great Brickhill
 Little Brickhill
 Bow Brickhill War Memorial

Notes

References

External links

Hymn tune "Bow Brickhill" (requires QuickTime)
(Civil) Parish web-site
 The Hogsty End Handbook local community magazine
Housing types in Bow Brickhill on MKWEB

Villages in Buckinghamshire
Areas of Milton Keynes